Amanda Kernell (born 9 September 1986) is a Swedish, Southern Sami director and screenwriter. She is best known for the movie Sami Blood, which won several awards.

Biography 
Amanda Kernell was born in Umeå. In her early teens, she devoted herself to acting and directing within the municipal theater. Her mother is Swedish, but through her father, she developed roots in Sami culture. She has, among other things, worked as a film educator in Västerbotten County, and acted in the film Maison (2007). In the years 2009–2013, Kernell attended and graduated from the National Film School of Denmark in Copenhagen. Kernell resides in Copenhagen, where, in addition to film-making, she also teaches film directing.

Education 
Kernell studied writing for the stage and audio visual media at Biskops-Arno where she also completed the Filpool Nord course “Screenwriting for low-budget feature films.” Beginning in 2009, Kernell attended the National Film school of Denmark, being one of the six students they bring in every two years.

Career 
In 2004 Amanda Kernell played the role of Lovisa in the short Maison, directed by Ann Holmgren. The story was about a daughter who was trying to connect with her closed off mother.  Amanda Kernell's filmographic career began in 2006 when she started directing shorts for the production company The Director & Fabrikorn, including The Holiday Sister, best short at the 2009 BUFF Children and Young Adult Film Festival and To Share Everything which received the 1 km Film Award. Her debut film was her short Our Disco in 2007 which is about   her film Northern Great Mountain world premiered at the 2015 Sundance Film Festival. This short film was later incorporated into her feature film debut Sami Blood which premiered at the 2016 Venice International Film Festival. She has written the script for every one of her films besides Our Disco. Charter is her second feature film and most recent. Amanda Kernell has been living in Denmark for the last 11 years where she is incorporating herself in Danish lifestyle and sharing that vision in her filming.

Awards and nominations 
Kernell received Best Young Director at the Venice Film Festival 2016 where she also received the Europa cinemas label for best European film. Later that year Sami Blood received Jury's special prize at the Tokyo international film festival. She went on to receive the Nordic film prize at the Gothenburg film festival 2017. In the same year she received Kurt Linder's scholarship from the Swedish film academy. Sami Blood was awarded four Golden Beetles at the Guldbagge gala in 2018 for best screenplay, best actress (lene Cecilia sparrok), best cut (anders skov) and audience award for best film. Kernell received the Dagens Nyheter Culture Prize in 2018 and the Swedish UN association's prize for human rights. In 2020 kernell's film Charter was nominated for Nordic council film prize and the Swedish academy award committee selected it for Sweden's entry for the Oscar for best international film for 2021 oscars. In December 2020 charter was nominated for guldbaggegalan 2021 in seven categories: best film, best director, best screenplay, best actress (ane dahl torp), best supporting actor (sverrir gudnason), best photo and best film design (sabine hviid).

Style and Themes 
Kernell states that "In my films, I always deal with topics such as forgiveness, responsibility, and betrayal." She tends to use close up shots and put a lot of the emphasis of the story on the actors. She prefers a "minimalistic form when shooting films, with camerawork that gets up close to characters and avoid overloading the movie with the decor or setting." Kernell believes that by doing this she will help the audience feel less lonely. Kernell loves to delve into the histories of her stories and incorporate how past events have their effects on society today. In Sami Blood she cast family members as extras because she believes it important that filmmakers tell their own stories.

Kernell makes a point of representing her fear through the story of Charter. She explored the experience of what it would be like to be a single mother of divorce and fighting for custody over a child.

Personal life 
Kernell experienced two very different cultures growing up with divorced parents with her mother being Swedish and her father being Sami. Her grandparents were nomadic reindeer herding families and only spoke Sami. They were only assimilated into the Swedish society once they went to residential schools in Sweden.

Awards (list) 
 2013, Uppsala short film pitch, Uppsala Film Festival
 2015, Best Swedish Short Film, Uppsala Film Festival
 2015, Audience Award: Best Swedish Short Film, Göteborg Film Festival
 2016, Best Young Director, 73rd Venice International Film Festival
 2016, Best European film, Europa Cinemas Label
 2016, Jury's special award, Tokyo International Film Festival
 2016, 2016 Toronto International Film Festival
 2017, Lux Award, 74th Venice International Film Festival
 2017, Lux Prize
 2017, Guldbagge Award for Best Screenplay
 2017, Dragon Award for Best Nordic Film, Gothenburg Film Festival
 2018, Gold Beetles for best screenplay, best female lead (Lene Cecilia Sparrok), best editing (Anders Skov), and audience award for best film, 53rd Guldbagge Awards
 2018, Dagens Nyheter cultural award
 2018, Swedish UN Federation's award for human rights
2021, Guldbagge for Best Director

Filmography 
 Våra Discon (Our Disco) (2007)
 Spel (Game) (2008)
 Sommarsystern (Summer Sister)(2008)
 Att dela allt (To Share Everything) (2009)
 Det kommer aldrig att gå över (It Will Never Go Over) (2011)
 Paradiset (Paradise) (2014)
 , also Norra Storfjället (2015) – a pilot and short film that forms the basis for the movie Sami blood
 I Will Always Love You Kingen (2016)
 Sami Blood (2017)
 Charter (2020)

References

External links 
 Official website
Amanda Kernell (nordicwomeninfilm.com)
Maison (Short 2004) - IMDb
Amanda Kernell • Director of Charter - Cineuropa

1986 births
Indigenous filmmakers in Europe
Living people
People from Umeå
Swedish Sámi people
Swedish film directors
Swedish screenwriters
Swedish women film directors
Swedish women screenwriters